Hưng Hà is a rural district (huyện) of Thái Bình province in the Red River Delta region of Vietnam. As of 2003 the district had a population of 252,912. The district covers an area of 200 km². The district capital lies at Hưng Hà.

References

Districts of Thái Bình province